"Atlas" is a song by British rock band Coldplay for The Hunger Games: Catching Fire – Original Motion Picture Soundtrack, the soundtrack to the 2013 American science-fiction adventure film The Hunger Games: Catching Fire. It was released digitally as the lead single from the soundtrack on 6 September 2013 worldwide, and on 8 September in the United Kingdom. The song was accompanied by a lyric video, which also premiered on 6 September.

"Atlas" has charted in 16 countries and reached top ten positions in three of them, and has also received mostly positive reviews from music critics. The ballad, won the Hollywood Song Award at the 17th Hollywood Film Awards, and was nominated for a Grammy Award for Best Song Written for Visual Media and a Golden Globe Award for Best Original Song.

Background and recording
"Atlas" was Coldplay's first new track in almost two years, as the band's fifth studio album Mylo Xyloto had been released in October 2011. The song was written in early 2013, at the beginning of the recording sessions for the band's sixth studio album Ghost Stories, and recorded between April and July at The Beehive, one of the band's two studios in London. The sound of "Atlas" was influential in shaping that of Ghost Stories and Coldplay had originally considered including the track on the album, but it was ultimately left out of the tracklist.
"Atlas" is not the first musical piece Coldplay have written for a film,  but it's the first one the band has released exclusively as part of a soundtrack, without re-using it for any of their following studio recordings. The song "We're a Team" from the same movie score is also co-written by Coldplay, and features elements of "Atlas".

"I have great respect and admiration for Coldplay, and we are thrilled with how well they have connected to the themes and ideas within the film. Their unwavering passion and excitement for the project elevated the collaboration even further, and we can't wait to share this music with audiences around the world," said the film's director Francis Lawrence.
"We are so honored that Coldplay, one of the iconic rock bands of our generation, will perform the first song out on the new soundtrack. Knowing that Chris Martin is a fan of the books makes this even more meaningful. The Coldplay single underscores the stature of recording artists we've assembled for this powerful soundtrack," added Tracy McKnight, Lionsgate's Head of Film Music.

Composition

The song was written by all band members and produced by Rik Simpson (with whom the band has previously worked on Viva la Vida or Death and All His Friends and Mylo Xyloto), Daniel Green (Mylo Xyloto) and Coldplay themselves.

The song is a down-tempo ballad, featuring a delicate piano refrain with a "moody, haunting melody", and showcasing Martin's lower-register vocals. According to some reviewers, it sounds "less like more recent Coldplay tracks and more like a throwback to their sound on A Rush of Blood to the Head," and "like a tossed-off remnant from the outfit's early days, before it began experimenting with deep rhythms and vivid textures." The piano builds to a bolder, "anthemic-quality" chorus with richly layered production, reminiscent of the band's fifth studio album, Mylo Xyloto.

Catching Fire'''s major themes informed the song lyrics, with multiple references to recurring elements of the story as well as to mythology and spirituality. According to Billboard magazine, "the lyrics abstractly touch upon main characters Katniss and Peeta's mutual reliance."

Critical reception
Upon release, "Atlas" received mostly positive reviews from music critics. Michael Nelson of Stereogum called the track "a swooning, appropriately cinematic ballad." Erin Coulehan of Rolling Stone magazine wrote, "The dreamy tune features a classic Coldplay presentation, with twinkling piano that builds as Chris Martin croons 'I'll carry your world'." "The dreamy, piano-driven track was clearly written specifically for 'Catching Fire,’ with lyrics like "some bend the bow" — about bow-and-arrow-wielding heroine Katniss, presumably – and "caught in the fire" (pretty self-explanatory)," wrote Karen Lanza of PopCrush.

Upon release of the soundtrack album, Consequence of Sound's Rob Hakimian called the song "spirited", and AllMusic's Heather Phares described it as "typically sweeping and earnest". Randall Roberts of the Los Angeles Times wrote, "Coldplay is here too, but in a battle with Lorde's haunting version of Tears for Fears' "Everybody Wants to Rule the World", Lorde would forever reign supreme." Slant Magazine's Blue Sullivan commented that "'Atlas' is autopilot Coldplay dipping into its back catalogue for a paycheck, but at least it approximates a pulse. Though the band may have zero insider-cred, 'Atlas' proves that 'Clocks' played at three-quarter speed with most of the chorus scooped out still runs rings around most of the current zeitgeist."

Awards and accolades

On 15 October 2013, it was announced that "Atlas" would receive the Hollywood Song Award at the 17th Hollywood Film Awards. The song was also performed at the gala ceremony, which took place on 21 October 2013 at the Beverly Hilton hotel. Carlos de Abreau, the Hollywood Film Awards founder and executive director, told The Hollywood Reporter, "The Hollywood Film Awards is thrilled to present the Hollywood Song Award to a band as globally respected and prolific as Coldplay. They continue to build their legacy and, with 'Atlas' marking the first time they have recorded for a motion picture, we cannot think of an artist better deserving of this honor."

On 7 December 2013, "Atlas" received a Grammy Award nomination in the Best Song Written for Visual Media category. On 12 December 2013, it was nominated for a Golden Globe Award for Best Original Song.

Commercial performance
"Atlas" has achieved moderate chart success, having charted in 16 countries. The song debuted at number twelve in the United Kingdom with sales of 19,546, and has reached top ten positions in the Netherlands, Italy and Switzerland. In the United States, it has reached number 69 on the Billboard Hot 100 chart, number 12 on the Rock Songs chart, and number 18 on the Alternative Songs chart. "Atlas" was also reported to have reached number one positions on iTunes Store charts in 43 countries upon its release. As of August 2014, "Atlas" has sold 246,000 downloads in the US.

Music video

A lyric video, reflecting the art style associated with The Hunger Games, premiered on music video website Vevo on the day of the single's release. It was directed by Mario Hugo and featured illustration by Micah Lidberg. The video "follows a shooting star coursing through the universe while tracing various constellations in the zodiac to the point of supernova."

Ray Rahman of Entertainment Weekly wrote, "Three things the internet is definitely not tired of yet – Coldplay, The Hunger Games'', and high-production lyric videos – have all converged in the form of "Atlas." (...) The just-released visual is an intense affair set on an astral plane, full of all sorts of Olympian imagery designed to get you excited for Katniss' return to the big screen this November."

Track listing

Personnel
Adapted from liner notes of the "Atlas" single.

Coldplay
 Guy Berryman – bass guitar
 Jonny Buckland – electric guitar
 Will Champion – drums, backing vocals
 Chris Martin – lead vocals, piano, keyboard

Additional personnel
 Daniel Green – production
 Rik Simpson – production

Charts

Weekly charts

Year-end charts

Release history

References

2010s ballads
2013 singles
2013 songs
Coldplay songs
Parlophone singles
Rock ballads
Song recordings produced by Rik Simpson
The Hunger Games music
Songs written by Guy Berryman
Songs written by Jonny Buckland
Songs written by Will Champion
Songs written by Chris Martin